The South Branch of the Gale River is a  river in the White Mountains of New Hampshire in the United States. Via the Gale River, it is a tributary of the Ammonoosuc River and part of the Connecticut River watershed.

The South Branch rises on the north slope of Mount Lafayette in the town of Franconia, New Hampshire, west of Garfield Ridge. It drops rapidly to the north and joins the North Branch to form the Gale River at the crossing of U.S. Route 3. The South Branch provides drinking water for the town of Bethlehem, New Hampshire.

See also

List of rivers of New Hampshire

References

Rivers of New Hampshire
Tributaries of the Connecticut River
Rivers of Grafton County, New Hampshire